Jazz Mission to Moscow is an album arranged and conducted by Al Cohn featuring Zoot Sims, Phil Woods, Bill Crow, Willie Dennis and Mel Lewis in performances recorded in 1962 following the Benny Goodman Band's tour of the Soviet Union which was released on the RCA Victor label.

Reception 

The Allmusic review by Scott Yanow called it "An interesting set of modern swing" and noted "In 1962 Benny Goodman had a historic visit to the Soviet Union, touring with a big band full of young all-stars. After the orchestra returned to the U.S., tenor saxophonist Al Cohn (who had not made the trip but did write some of Goodman's charts) put together an album (also released by Colpix) using many of the sidemen and paying tribute to the event".

Track listing 
 "Mission to Moscow" (Mel Powell) – 4:20
 "The Sochi Boatman" (Traditional) – 5:17
 "Midnight in Moscow" (Vasily Solovyov-Sedoi, Mikhail Matusovsky) – 5:59
 "Let's Dance" (Gregory Stone, Josef Bonime, Fanny Baldridge) – 4:32
 "Russian Lullaby" (Irving Berlin) – 5:39
 "Red, White and Blue Eyes" (Traditional) – 4:53

Personnel 
Al Cohn – arranger, conductor
Markie Markowitz, Jimmy Maxwell – trumpet
Willie Dennis – trombone
Phil Woods – alto saxophone, clarinet
Jerry Dodgion – alto saxophone, flute
Zoot Sims – tenor saxophone
Gene Allen – baritone saxophone
Eddie Costa – piano
Bill Crow – bass
Mel Lewis – drums

References 

1962 albums
Colpix Records albums
Al Cohn albums